Schott is a surname. People with that name include:
Andreas Schott (1552-1629), Flemish academic, linguist, translator, editor and a Jesuit priest
Anselm Schott, Benedictine monk and author
Arthur Carl Victor Schott, German-American artist and naturalist
Basil Schott, Byzantine Catholic archbishop 
Ben Schott, author of Schott's Miscellanies & Schott's Almanac
Bernhard Schott (1748-1809), German music publisher
Cécile Schott, the real name of electronic musician Colleen
Charles Anthony Schott, a German scientist
Franck Schott, French swimmer
George Adolphus Schott, (sometimes referenced as George Augustus Schott), English mathematician
Heinrich Wilhelm Schott, 19th-century botanist
Helena Schott, birthname of the English actress Helena Cécile Ernstone
Lawrence Frederik Schott, American Roman Catholic bishop
Marge Schott, former owner of the Cincinnati Reds
Otto Schott, German chemist and inventor of borosilicate glass
Penelope Schott, American poet

Fictional people called Schott:
Winslow Schott, the usual alter-ego of fictional DC Comics character Toyman

German-language surnames
Ethnonymic surnames